I’m Obsessed with You (But You’ve Got to Leave Me Alone)  is an American comedy-drama film directed by Jon Goracy, written by Genevieve Adams, and starring Manish Dayal, Rachel Brosnahan, Thomas McDonell, Genevieve Adams and Jason Ralph.

The film premiered at the Sonoma International Film Festival in April 2014 and opened on video on demand 11 November 2014.

Plot
When a magnetic movie star crashes their party the day before graduation, four collegiate comedians are forced to confront the group's friendship and future.

Cast
 Manish Dayal as Cyrus Kapoor
 Rachel Brosnahan as Nell Fitzpatrick
 Thomas McDonell as Freddie Diaz
 Olek Krupa as Stanislaw
 Jason Ralph as Jake Birnbaum
 Genevieve Adams as Keri Langdon
 Neil Casey as Flamboyant Fan

Production
The film was based on an off-Broadway play, “IMPROVed”, written by Genevieve Adams. Adams developed the play from her Dartmouth College senior thesis. After the Broadway success of “IMPROVed”, Adams created a Kickstarter campaign to raise funds for the production of a feature film based on the play. Following his work with Adams on “IMPROVed”, John Goracy joined the production team for “I’m Obsessed with You” as the film’s director. The film was shot in Dartmouth College,  New York City, and the Hamptons.

References

External links 
 
 

2014 films
American comedy-drama films
American independent films
2010s English-language films
2010s American films